2010–11 season is the first Moldovan National Division season in the history of Costuleni.

Squad

References

External links
 Official Costuleni Website

Moldovan football clubs 2010–11 season
2010-11